San Pablo del Monte (formerly Villa Vicente Guerrero) is the largest city in the Mexican state of Tlaxcala, and is the municipal seat of the municipality of San Pablo del Monte. It is located at the southernmost point in the state, near the border with the adjoining state of Puebla. It is a suburb of the city of Puebla and a component of its metropolitan area. At the census of 2005 the population of the city was 55,760.

For many years the town was named after the revolutionary general Vicente Guerrero. The name was changed to the same name of the surrounding municipality effective December 20, 2016, by way of a decree published in the official gazette of the state government.

References

Link to tables of population data from Census of 2005 INEGI: Instituto Nacional de Estadística, Geografía e Informática

Populated places in Tlaxcala